Events in the year 1649 in Norway.

Incumbents
Monarch: Frederick III

Events
The Hassel Iron Works, starts to operate.

Arts and literature

Births
27 September - Jonas Danilssønn Ramus, priest and historian (died 1718)

Deaths